Väter und Söhne – Eine deutsche Tragödie (English title: Fathers and Sons: A German Tragedy) is a 1986 German-language television miniseries directed by Bernhard Sinkel and starring Burt Lancaster, Julie Christie.

Plot
The series explores the lives of two German industrial dynasties, one of Jewish bankers and the other the founders of a chemical empire. For three generations, their plots and plans, loves and betrayals help the rise of Germany and then to total destruction. The Deutz end up in the dock, on trial for war crimes at Nuremberg, while his trusted friends, the Bemheim, with one exception, have been killed.

Cast

References 
Film-Dienst, Vol 58,Number 8-13, by Katholisches Institut für Medieninformation (Germany), Katholische Filmkommission für Deutschland

External links 

1986 films
1986 television films
1986 drama films
1980s business films
English-language German films
English-language French films
English-language Italian films
English-language television shows
Das Erste original programming
Films about families
Films about Nazi Germany
Films directed by Bernhard Sinkel
Films set in the 1910s
Films set in the 1920s
Films set in the 1930s
Films set in the 1940s
French drama films
1980s French television miniseries
German drama films
German-language television shows
1980s German television miniseries
Italian drama films
Italian television miniseries
West German films
1980s Italian films
1980s French films
1980s German films